is a United States Army post located in the city of Sagamihara, in Kanagawa Prefecture, Japan, about  southwest of Tokyo.

Depot
Sagami General Depot is located in the city of Sagamihara, Kanagawa Prefecture, Honshu, Japan. Sagami Depot is home to the 38th Air Defense Artillery Brigade, Defense Commissary Agency Central Distribution Center, Defense Logistics Agency for US forces in Japan, and Army Medical Storage.

History
Sagami General Depot currently occupies the grounds of a former Japanese Imperial Army installation which opened in 1935 as the Sixth Arsenal under Colonel Ikeda as a branch of the Tokyo First Army Arsenal.  In 1936 the Imperial Army made the arsenal a separate activity and renamed it Sagami Army Arsenal.  The primary function was manufacturing armaments and weapons, mostly tanks, for the Japanese Army.  Sagami Depot was also the test bed for the development of the 120-ton “O-I” experimental heavy tank as well as manufacturing balloon incendiary devices which Japanese forces launched from Chiba to start fires in the west coast region of the U.S.

In September 1945, Sagami was occupied by the U.S. Army 5th Cavalry Regiment.  The installation played a major role in the support of U.S. forces during the Korean War.  In 1957 the Army began to scale back operations at Sagami General Depot and U.S. Army Supply and Maintenance Activity (which performed maintenance and repair of heavy equipment and tanks) was inactivated after the Vietnam War.  Today, the installation continues to be used as a U.S. Army logistics and supply facility continuing to honor its commitment to Japan’s defense.

From 1935 to the end of World War II, this location was known as the Sagami Army Arsenal, where Mitsubishi developed and manufactured tanks for use by the Imperial Japanese Army.

In September 2015, land for the former housing area was returned to Japan with a portion designated for joint use. At around 12:45 a.m., August 24, 2015, there were reported explosions at the depot in a storage building containing tanks of nitrogen, Freon, oxygen and compressed air.

References

External links

 Sagami General Depot
https://www.army.mil/38ada

Installations of the United States Army in Japan
1935 establishments in Japan